Jon Calvert Strauss is an American academic administrator who has served as a college president at Worcester Polytechnic Institute, Harvey Mudd College, Manhattanville College, acting president of Iona University and most recently as interim president of Paul Smith's College from 2020 to 2021. 

Strauss received his  his bachelor's degree from the University of Wisconsin–Madison, his masters in physics from the University of Pittsburgh, and his PhD in electrical engineering from the Carnegie Institute of Technology. 

Strauss served as the 13th president of Worcester Polytechnic Institute from 1985 to 1994. He then briefly served as the  chief financial officer of Howard Hughes Medical Institute. Strauss was the 4th president of Harvey Mudd College, serving in that position from March 1997 to June 2006. He served as President of the Bainbridge Graduate Institute in 2008–2009, accepting this appointment from former president and BGI Co-founder Gifford Pinchot III.  

Dr. Strauss next served as the interim dean of engineering at Texas Tech University. From 2011 to 2016, he served as the 12th President of Manhattanville College in Purchase, New York, replacing Molly Easo Smith. He was acting president of Iona University in spring 2017 and interim president of Paul Smith's College from 2020 to 2021.

He is a former member and current consultant of the National Science Board. Strauss has also served as Senior Vice-president of the University of Southern California and Vice President for Budget and Finance at the University of Pennsylvania. At Penn, he helped to develop the Responsibility Center Management (RCM).

He is married to Jean Anne Sacconaghi Strauss, a writer, activist and filmmaker. He has four children: daughters Susan MacQuarrie and Stephanie Annan from his first marriage, and two sons, Kristoffer Calvert Strauss and Jonathon Samuel Louis Strauss and six grandchildren.

References

External links
Bainbridge Graduate Institute
Harvey Mudd College Office of the President
Past Presidents of the Worcester Polytechnic Institute

Living people
University of Wisconsin–Madison alumni
Presidents of Worcester Polytechnic Institute
American chief financial officers
Carnegie Mellon University College of Engineering alumni
University of Pittsburgh alumni
Pinchot University people
Year of birth missing (living people)